Scott Tinsley is an American football coach.  He served as head football coach at West Virginia State University in Institute, West Virginia from 1992 through 1994 and at West Virginia University Institute of Technology from  2008 to 2011, compiling a career college football coaching record of 17–56.

After a successful 13-year stint as the head football coach at Nitro High School, Tinsley was named head football coach at West Virginia Tech in Montgomery, West Virginia. He served there from 2008 through the 2011 season, when the program was discontinued. His coaching record at West Virginia Tech was 6–37.

Head coaching record

College

References

Year of birth missing (living people)
Living people
Appalachian State Mountaineers football coaches
Appalachian State Mountaineers football players
West Virginia State Yellow Jackets football coaches
West Virginia Tech Golden Bears football coaches
High school football coaches in West Virginia
People from St. Albans, West Virginia
Sportspeople from West Virginia